Rated Rexx is the third studio album by American heavy metal/glam metal band Diamond Rexx. It was released by Red Light Records in 1990, and reissued by Crash Music Inc. in 2002.

Track listing 
All tracks by S. St. Lust and Nasti Habits, except where noted.
 "Instant Medication" – 3:48
 "Lady's Nite" – 3:52 (Johnny Angel, Habits)
 "Easy Kill" – 3:37 (Johnny Cottone, Lust, Habits)
 "How Do You Know" – 3:25 (Dave Andre, Lust, Habits)
 "Heartbreak City" – 3:19 (Angel, Habits, Chrissy Salem)
 "Don't Let It Get You Down" – 2:32
 "4 Letter Word" – 3:33
 "Color Red" – 4:17
 "Guillotine" – 3:19 (Angel, Habits, Salem)
 "Lock It Up" – 4:35
 "Sleaze Patrol" – 3:04
 "Bad Attitude" – 2:31 (Angel, Habits)

Personnel

The band
Nasti Habits – Lead vocals
Johnny L. Angel – Guitar, backing vocals
Chrissy Salem – Bass, backing vocals
Tim Tully – Drums, backing vocals

Production
 Bruce Pederson – Producer
 Mark Nawara – Executive producer

References 

Diamond Rexx albums